= Henry Sylvester Cornwell =

American physician and poet

Henry Sylvester Cornwell (1831-June 15, 1886) was an American medical doctor and poet.

Cornwell was a native of New London, Connecticut. He was one of a family of nine children, in humble circumstances, and for many years before his professional education he was a workman in a manufactory in New London. He graduated from Yale Medical School in 1863. Returning to New London after graduation, he soon acquired a lucrative practice, but failing health (from consumption) prevented him from making the most of his powers. He early became known as a poet and his occasional contributions to the local papers had more than a merely local reputation. He published one volume of his pieces, The Land of Dreams, and Other Poems (New London, 1878, 12mo.)

Cornwell was a fan of Edgar Allan Poe and was the owner of a well-preserved Poe daguerreotype.

Cornwell died in New London, June 15, 1886, aged 51 years. The immediate cause of his death was an ulcer in the stomach.

This article incorporates public domain material from the 1886 Yale Obituary Record.
